A Device Register is the view any device presents to a programmer.
Each programmable bit in the device is presented with a logical address and it appears as a part of a byte in the device registers. Then programming of these bits can be achieved by reading from or writing to these device registers.
Most devices have at least these two device registers:
 Data Register: to which the data to be input/output is read from/written to the device.
 Control/Status: Which selects/shows the mode of operation of the device.

Digital registers